Bruce Waller was a contemporary American philosopher notable for his theories about the nature of free will and its implications for human society. He was a philosophy professor at Youngstown State University from 1990 until he retired in 2019. Waller passed away on February 8, 2023 at the age of 76.

Philosophy
Waller is a determinist who believes that everything that happens, had to happen, and could not have happened otherwise, and that all events are necessitated to happen by the process of cause and effect, that is, that past, present, and future consist of an essentially unbreakable chain of circumstances of which no single link in such a chain could possibly be avoided or altered. Since he believes that determinism and moral responsibility are mutually incompatible, he has sometimes been identified as an incompatibilist.

In Against Moral Responsibility (2011), he noticed, despite growing scientific evidence for determinism, that people cling steadfastly to the free-will based idea of moral responsibility. Moral responsibility assumes that humans are active causal agents who can choose to do one of two different alternatives, and therefore are morally deserving of praise or blame or reward or punishment for their choices. He views praise and blame and other related notions as being illogical in a scientific sense and impossible to justify; for example, it does not make sense to blame a person for doing what they did, if they couldn't have helped it, he argues. Waller's explanation of the entrenchment of a belief in moral responsibility in the popular consciousness is partly that there are systems of interlocking beliefs connecting free will and praise and blame and belief in a just world, and that these beliefs, taken together, reinforce the validity of punishment and serve as underpinnings of the criminal justice system. He argues that this current worldview is incorrect and should be examined critically.

Waller argues that belief in free will and moral responsibility brings a slew of problems, particularly a miserable world for the less fortunate. In particular, it leads to multiple "doses" of unfairness:
 poor initial developmental luck for the less fortunate
 belief that they were somehow responsible for their bad luck
 widening social inequalities

That there is no ultimate free will does not nullify human freedom of choice, according to Waller. In his 2015 book Restorative Free Will, he made a case that even while everything is determined, humans have the cognitive capacity to generate options to cope with specific situations, and further, that humans must use this capacity by choosing the best options. He argues that this sense of free will, meaning freedom of choice without external constraint, is consistent with determinism, and his view has been gaining critical traction among scholars and in the media. Accordingly, in Waller's view, it is proper to discourage people from being lazy, but wrong to blame them for their laziness since the reason for their laziness can be found in a deterministic assessment of the "blind lottery of biology and environment", that is, it's not their fault.

Critics of Waller's view have maintained that if people abandon their notions of free will and moral responsibility, that people may be unable to restrain themselves and they may misbehave, or engage in criminality or vice, since they will know that whatever they will do, that they will be held as blameless. In contrast, Waller argues that jettisoning moral responsibility will not permit people to behave immorally or without any consideration of consequences; rather, he argues that a better world will result. He explained that accountability will continue regardless, and he illustrated the point with an example: "If I borrow a large sum of money from a friend, and then hit financial hardship and am unable to repay the loan, it is not as if I am suddenly relieved of my moral obligation to repay." Waller disagrees with scholars such as Clemson's Ryan Lake, who argues that a belief in determinism prevents people from feeling "true apology" or sincere regret since that requires taking or accepting responsibility for one's failings. Waller disagrees, saying that apologies and regret are still consistent with a deterministic world. In short, abolishing ultimate moral responsibility will not have the dire consequences which some critics hypothesize, according to Waller.

Waller believes no one deserves harmful treatment, including convicted criminals, although he realizes that some people must be locked behind bars for pragmatic reasons of public safety. He believes punishment should be minimized since it often backfires, and sometimes encourages subsequent harmful behavior. He believes that an acceptance of determinism would bring about the positive outcome of making people less punishment-oriented and less retributive, and that human responses to the problem of crime would become more practical and beneficial overall.

Publications

 Critical Thinking: Consider the Verdict, 2023 (7th edition), Waveland Press
 Free Will, Moral Responsibility, and the Desire to Be a God, 2020, Rowman & Littlefield
The Injustice of Punishment, 2020, Routledge
Restorative Free Will: Back to the Biological Base, 2015, Lexington Books
 The Stubborn System of Moral Responsibility 2014, MIT Press
 Congenial Debates on Controversial Questions, 2013, Pearson
 Against Moral Responsibility, MIT Press, Cambridge, Massachusetts, 2011
 Consider Philosophy, 2010,  Pearson
 Consider Ethics: Theory, Readings, and Contemporary Issues (3rd Edition) , 2010, Pearson
 You Decide! Current Debates in Criminal Justice (anthology), 2008, Pearson
 Coffee and Philosophy: A Conversational Introduction to Philosophy with Readings, 2005, Pearson
 The Natural Selection of Autonomy, 1998, SUNY Press
 Freedom Without Responsibility, 1990, Temple University Press

References

External links
 
 Youngstown State University faculty page

American philosophers
People from Youngstown, Ohio
University of North Carolina at Chapel Hill alumni
Determinists
Living people
Year of birth missing (living people)